Henri Édouard Loux (20 February 1873, Auenheim - 19 January 1907, Strasbourg) was an Alsatian designer, watercolorist and poster artist. He is best known for the porcelain designs he created for "Obernai" tableware.

Biography 
He spent what is described as a "happy, rural" childhood in Rountzenheim. He studied at a Protestant gymnasium in Strasbourg, where he was poor student, except for his artistic abilities.
Later, he enrolled at the Academy of Fine Arts, Munich, where he was influenced by Art Nouveau.

He returned to Strasbourg in 1897. After his father died, in 1901, he lived with his mother. During this time, he began his career doing graphic work for a new magazine called the Neuer Elsässer Bilderbogen. It failed to establish itself and folded after only a dozen issues. Shortly after, in 1902, he came into contact with Utzschneider & Cie, a faience manufactory in Sarreguemines. It was for them he would create his most familiar work: 36 designs for dishes and other tableware that would become associated with the city of Obernai, and be known by that name. The designs consist primarily of country and village scenes, typical of Alsace around the year 1900. The success of these designs would eclipse all of his other work.

He died, aged only thirty-three, of heart failure, caused by tuberculosis. In 1997, the Musée historique de Haguenau held a major retrospective.

References

Further reading 
 Paul-André Befort, Fernand Gastebois; Henri Loux 1873–1907: Il a mis l'Alsace dans nos assiettes, Dernières nouvelles d'Alsace, 1985 
 Paul-André Befort, Fernand Gastebois; Henri Loux: L'artiste de l'âme alsacienne, 2011 
 Fernand Gastebois, "Henri Édouard Loux", in Nouveau dictionnaire de biographie alsacienne, vol. 25, p. 2442
Gilles Pudlowski, "Henri Loux", in Dictionnaire amoureux de l'Alsace, Plon, Paris, 2010 pps.447-452 
 Michel Weyl, Le service de table Obernai d'Henri Loux: Formes et décors, Les Petites vagues éditions, 2008, 
 Association des amis de Henri Loux, Loux où es-tu ? Hier et aujourd'hui,

External links 

 Henri Loux @ the Mairie d'Auenheim
 Watercolors by Loux @ Les Costumes Alsaciennes

1873 births
1907 deaths
French designers
Ceramic art
French watercolourists
Alsatian people
People from Bas-Rhin